Yeh Hai Jalwa is a 2002 Indian Hindi-language romantic comedy film directed by David Dhawan. It stars an ensemble cast, including Salman Khan, Rishi Kapoor, Amisha Patel, Sanjay Dutt and Shammi Kapoor, with Kader Khan, Rati Agnihotri, Anupam Kher, Kiran Kumar, Rinke Khanna and Sharad Kapoor in supporting roles. It is inspired by Hollywood flick Carbon Copy.

Plot
  
The story is about an orphan named Raj Saxena/Mittal aka Raju a businessman in India. His mother died when he was very young, his father had already left him. At work, Raju witnesses Rajesh Mittal winning an award on TV. Raju realizes that Rajesh is none other than his dad, and leaves immediately for London. At the airport, he meets Sonia Singh, who has too much luggage and tries to get Raju to hold it. Raju understands her plan, and it backfires on Sonia. The two then begin to believe they love each other. After this, Raju finds Rajesh and tells him the truth. He then finds out that Rajesh is already married to Smitha and has two kids, Rinkie and Bunty. Rinkie is about to marry Vicky, but she is unaware of his drug dealings. Raju gives Rajesh seven days to break the news to his family and call Raju his son or he'll tell the family himself. After he leaves, Rajesh gets afraid and hires gangsters to attack him. On his way out, Raju gets beat up by the hired gangsters, though later rescued by Shera also an Indian living in London. He saves Raju from getting beat up and helps him as well.

He advises Raju to go into Rajesh's house as a family friend, and that he should get to know the entire family. When Raju asks Rajesh to give him a good place to stay, Rajesh takes Raju to his friend Robin Singh's mansion. There he meets Sonia again and learns that she is Robin's daughter. They gradually fall in love. On the eighth day, Raju goes to Rajesh's bungalow but realizes the family is on holiday. Therefore, Raju goes back to India, until he overhears Robin calling Rajesh and inviting him over to his house. Raju gets into the boot of Rajesh's car so he can also go with them.

Rajesh is horrified when he sees Raju come. Raju stays with the family at the resort. Rajesh finds out that Raju's visa has expired and he calls the police. They take Raju. Purshottam Mithal is at the airport as he has come back from Paris and Raju sees him. Raju tells him that he knows Rajesh. Purshottam renews Raju's visa and takes him back to the Mithal mansion.

When Rajesh gets home he thinks that he will have no problems with Raju, but he is mistaken and he sees Raju at his mansion. A few days later, Rajesh has to go to a conference overseas and Raju accompanies him. The company that Rajesh is in a partnership with is blaming Rajesh for no sales lately. Raju then explains to the company that it's their fault because their products are crap. Rajesh tells Raju to be quiet but the company urges Raju to go on. The say to Raju to come and join their company but he says he can't leave Rajesh. Rajesh is very happy with Raju and he gets drunk and he calls Raju his son.

When Rajesh gets up in the morning, Raju has bought in breakfast. Raju then goes to patch things up with Sonia, only to witness her trying to make him jealous by flirting with another boy. When he leaves to stop her, he realizes the boy she is flirting with is actually Shera, his good friend. He explains his problem, and that the two actually love each other, so Shera backs off and explains to Raju that if he needs any help, he would be there. He also tells Raju where Vicky always drug deals.

Raju catches Vicky red-handed as he is talking to his partners about dealing drugs. Raju shows Rajesh and Rinkie the truth and Rinkie is devastated. Rajesh hits Vicky and Vicky shoots Rajesh.

Rajesh is taken to the hospital. Both of his kidneys have failed and he needs a kidney. Purshottam offers him but he is diabetic so he can't. Smitha does too but her blood group doesn't match Rajesh's. Smitha says that Bunty will but he denies as he wants to be a pop singer. She says Rinkie will but she denies to as she wants to have babies when she is older. The next morning Purshottam tells the doctor that he has called all his relatives and one of them at least will be able to give a kidney. The doctor tells him not to worry as someone has already given one. He asks who but the doctor says that the person has asked to keep him anonymous.

In the end, Rajesh confesses to the family that Raju is his son. Raju says he is lying and Rajesh is confused. He says to Raju, "Didn't you want me to say this?," and Raju says, "Why are you lying? You're not my father." But Raju does confess and everyone finds out that Raju was the one who gave a kidney to Rajesh. Purshottam and Smitha aren’t mad at Rajesh but in fact happy that Raju is related to them. They live happily ever after.

Cast 
 Rishi Kapoor as Rajesh 'Raj' Mittal
 Salman Khan as Raj 'Raju' Saxena / Raj Mittal
 Amisha Patel as Sonia Singh Mittal
 Sanjay Dutt as Shera (extended special appearance)
 Poonam Dhillon as Meghna Saxena (photograph)
 Rati Agnihotri as Smita Mittal
 Rinke Khanna as Rinkie Mittal
 Shammi Kapoor as Boss
 Anupam Kher as Robin Singh 
 Kader Khan as Purshottam Mittal
 Sharad Kapoor as Vikram aka Vicky
 Ajay Nagrath as Bunty Mittal
 Anil Nagrath as Dr. Khanna
 Shahbaz Khan as Chotu 
 Kiran Kumar as Chotu's elder brother 
 Navin Nischol as Surgeon 
 Jaspal Bhatti as Buta Singh
 Gavin Packard as Goon

Soundtrack

The album features seven songs composed by Himesh Reshammiya and the lyrics penned by Sudhakar Sharma apart from the song "London Mein India" which was composed by Anand Raj Anand and lyrics were penned by Dev Kohli.

Track lists

Critical response
Taran Adarsh of Bollywood Hungama gave the film 1.5 stars out of 5, writing: ″On the whole, YEH HAI JALWA is an ordinary entertainer with nothing much to rave about.″ Chitra Mahesh of The Hindu wrote: ″Usually these days, even if the film lacks credibility it is made up by good cinematography, special effects or sometimes even the music — in this case, however, none of these elements help in salvaging either the story or the proceedings. At best it's a film you can watch if you are terribly jobless!.″ Priya Ganapati of Rediff.com wrote: ″While there was some method in the madness of Dhawan's earlier flicks, Aankhen, Saajan Chale Sasural and Coolie No 1, Dhawan's recent films have been insipid. His last two releases -- Kyunkii Main Jhooth Nahi Bolta and Hum Kisise Se Kum Nahin -- slipped out of the theatres in a jiffy. Yeh Hai Jalwa will only complete the trilogy of disasters for Dhawan.″

References

External links 
 
 

2002 films
2000s Hindi-language films
2002 romantic comedy-drama films
Films directed by David Dhawan
Films scored by Himesh Reshammiya
Indian romantic comedy-drama films
2002 comedy films
2002 drama films